Han Bo-reum (born Kim Bo-reum; February 12, 1987) is a South Korean actress and model.

Filmography

Television series

Film

Variety Show

Music video

Awards and nominations

References

External links

1987 births
Living people
South Korean television actresses
South Korean film actresses